The 1995 Marlboro Masters of Formula 3 was the fifth Masters of Formula 3 race held at Circuit Park Zandvoort on 6 August 1995. It was won by Norberto Fontana, for KMS.

Drivers and teams
All cars were equipped with a Dallara F395 chassis.

Classification

Qualifying

Race

References

Masters of Formula Three
Masters of Formula Three
Masters of Formula Three
Masters of Formula Three